Lau Ho Lam (born 22 January 1993) is a Hong Kong professional footballer who currently plays as a midfielder for Hong Kong Premier League club Sham Shui Po.

Club career

Tuen Mun
Lau started his career at Tuen Mun in the Third District Division.

Eastern
After few disappointing seasons at Tuen Mun, Lau signed for Eastern in 2012 in the Second Division. He failed to make any appearances after the club was promoted to the First Division in 2013.

Wong Tai Sin
He then went on to sign for Wong Tai Sin in 2014 where he finally made his first HKPL debut.

Metro Gallery
He signed for Metro Gallery in 2015.

Yuen Long
He played for Yuen Long where he scored his first league goal in his career. While with the club, he won the 2017–18 Senior Shield, capturing the trophy against his parent club in the final.

Southern
After finding playing time hard to come by at Eastern, Lau agreed to a loan to Southern for the 2019–20 season. He officially joined the club a year later.

International career
Lau was part of the Hong Kong squad which took part in the 2017 Guangdong–Hong Kong Cup on 1 and 4 January 2017.

Honours
Eastern
Hong Kong FA Cup: 2013–14

Yuen Long
Hong Kong Senior Shield: 2017–18

References

External links
 
 

1993 births
Living people
Tuen Mun SA players
Eastern Sports Club footballers
Metro Gallery FC players
Yuen Long FC players
Southern District FC players
Sham Shui Po SA players
Hong Kong Premier League players
Hong Kong First Division League players
Hong Kong footballers
Association football midfielders